Constantin Iancu may refer to:

 Costel Iancu, Romanian politician
 Constantin Iancu (bobsleigh) (born 1948), Romanian bobsledder
 Constantin Iancu (footballer), Romanian footballer